A revenge eviction is a term used in the United Kingdom to describe an eviction process initiated by a landlord where a tenant asks for repairs to be carried out or complains about conditions. Campaign groups such as Shelter have called for revenge evictions to be legislated against.

England and Wales 
In England and Wales, an assured shorthold tenancy is the default legal category for residential tenancies. This allows a section 21 notice eviction, which does not require the landlord to have any reason for evicting tenants after a fixed-term tenancy ends or during a tenancy with no fixed end date. This allows landlords to evict or threaten tenants that complain without needing to give an explanation. The Deregulation Act 2015 introduced some curbs on when a section 21 notice of possession may be served upon a tenant following a complaint of disrepair. However, data collected since then suggests that very few tenants are protected from revenge evictions after making complaints about their housing quality.

A 2015 Citizens Advice study on section 21 evictions found that tenants evicted using this process were twice as likely to have complained to their landlord, and six times as likely to have complained about their landlord to a local authority.

Several groups, including Generation Rent, Shelter, and the Local Government Association, have called on the government to scrap section 21 for this reason.

References

Landlord–tenant law